Ioan Gabor Snep (born 12 July 1966) is a retired Romanian rower. Competing in coxed pairs and coxed fours he won silver medals at the 1988 Olympics and 1989 and 1991 world championships. After retiring from competitions he worked as a rowing coach. His wife Doina Snep, sister-in-law Anișoara Bălan and brother-in-law Valentin Robu are also retired Olympic rowers.

References

External links
 

1966 births
Living people
Romanian male rowers
Olympic rowers of Romania
Rowers at the 1988 Summer Olympics
Rowers at the 1992 Summer Olympics
Olympic silver medalists for Romania
Olympic medalists in rowing
World Rowing Championships medalists for Romania
Medalists at the 1988 Summer Olympics